Dadagiri Unlimited is an Indian Bengali language quiz show. The programme has been airing on Zee Bangla since 2009. Sourav Ganguly, the former captain of the India national cricket team and former president of the Board of Control for Cricket in India, hosted the first two seasons. Actor Mithun Chakraborty replaced him in the third season, but he continued hosting the show replacing Chakraborty from the fourth season onwards.

The contestants are chosen by a preliminary selection round held in different parts of the state West Bengal, and every contestant represents their respective districts of West Bengal. The show premiered on 27 July 2009. The title track has been penned by Srijit Mukherji. and sung by Arijit Singh.

On 20 December 2009, Kolkata won the finale (Bollywood actor Shah Rukh Khan was the celebrity guest in the finale episode of the first season); and in season 2, North 24 Parganas won. Dadagiri season 3 was organized on 20 October 2011 and ended on 3 June 2012. It was hosted by Mithun Chakraborty. The then undivided Bardhaman secured the trophy of Season 3.

Season 4 started on 26 August 2013 and ended on 23 February 2014. This season, the main host, Sourav Ganguly hosted the show. In that season, North 24 Parganas secured the win for the second time. Bollywood personalities Farhan Akhtar and Vidya Balan were celebrity guests in the finale of season 4, who came to promote their film Shaadi Ke Side Effects. Season 5 started on 17 November 2014 and ended on 7 June 2015. Season 6 began on 11 January 2016 and ended on 3 July 2016. Season 7 began on 10 June 2017 and ended on 25 February 2018, Sachin Tendulkar made an appearance in the final. Season 8 started airing on 3 August 2019 and temporarily halted in March 2020 due to the lockdown measures taken to tackle the COVID-19 pandemic. After the lockdown, it started airing in late August 2020, ending with the Grand Finale which was aired on 13 September 2020. On 25 September 2021, this show was held with a brand new look as season 9. Their new slogan was "Haat barale bondhu hoy". This season was ended on 5 June 2022.

Sometimes, notable Bengali celebrities or renowned personalities come to play the game for the bottom six districts on the list.

Rounds

Selection 
The contestants from 24 districts of West Bengal with Probasi Bangali (Expatriate District-for participants of West Bengal living outside the state) compete in this round. In season 7, the name 'Probasi' was replaced by 'Team India'. However, from season 8 onwards, the team was renamed as 'Prabasi'. In this round, 20 districts of West Bengal along with Probasi Bangali could play. They had to answer 6 questions by pressing buttons against the options. Normally the questions were a 'yes-no' type question, with two options- right and wrong. From each question, one player from a district could be selected for the following rounds. This new system was introduced in season 5.

In the previous seasons, all the participants had to answer one question with four options, from which the six fastest participants to answer, were selected.

In all, 6 participants could be selected from this round. The remaining 14 contestants could play by helping the 6 selected players in Power Play Round and Cover Drive Round, from the Runners' Bench.

As all the districts did not get equal chances to play the game and increase their score in the leaderboard, to give equal chances to all the districts to play the game, this round was dissolved from season 7 and now the districts are randomly picked to play the game giving chances to everyone by the makers in each episode.

Toss 
Six selected contestants from 23 districts of West Bengal and a contestant representing Team India could participate in this round. Six clues were given for a single answer, from which the participants had to guess the answer.

From season 4, a seventh clue had been included, which was presented after the participants finalized their guess in the sixth clue from which the answer gets quite obvious. The participants' 'runs' are deducted if their guess is wrong, while they are awarded points if their guess is correct. The number of runs awarded or deducted depends on the number of clues the contestant used to finalize his/her guess. In the later seasons, this round has got tougher with the clue being vague and the answers unexpected.

In season 8, participants would need to write their guesses from the first clue but without telling anyone, which is revealed at the end before announcing the seventh clue i.e., the answer. If the 1st and 6th answer of the contestant is same and it is correct, the contestant wins 12 points.

In season 9, six contestants from 23 districts of West Bengal and a contestant representing Probashi can participate in this round. In this season, the writing of the first clue got removed, and the whole rule has changed. Dada will have a coin where Dadagiri logo will be head and 'Season 9' writing will be tail. If it is head, his right sided participants will answer the 2nd, 4th and 6th clue and left sided one will answer 1st, 3rd and 5th clue. If it is tail, his left sided participants will answer the 2nd, 4th and 6th clue and the right sided one will answer the 1st, 3rd and 5th clue.

Scoring

The contestant will get more points who finals the answer more quickly. For example, if someone answers in the 5th clue, he would get 2 points if correct and -2 if wrong. Similarly, for 4th clue it is 3 or -3 and so on. But if someone changes the answer in the middle and returns to the previous answer in the last clue, it would be considered that the one has locked his answer on the last clue. Like: 

None are eliminated.

Power Play 
All six contestants play this round. Random questions of nine people were selected to ask the contestants. If they can answer without taking options, they get 12 runs. They can also select from questions valued two, four, or six runs if they wish. A two-run question includes two options, a four-run question has three options, while a six-run question has four options while a 12 run question has no options.

If any other contestant thinks that the contestant's answer is wrongfulness, he/she can challenge that particular contestant, receiving double runs if the answer is correct, but losing double runs if the answer is wrong. This thing can be done thrice- as challenge 1, 2 and 3.

In season 8, the participants had to answer the questions given by the people of Captain's Squad.

In season 9, there will be a question score selection spinner. Participants will have to answer based on the 2, 4, 6 and 12 runs wherever it lands on. But, if he gets 2, 4 or 6 runs question, he has a chance to upgrade the answer to 12 runs question. And also, Captain's Squad is removed in season 9 which means the participants can't take help from others.

One contestant is eliminated at the end of this round.

This round was renamed Packup or Panga in season 3 and Bouncer in the second half of season 7 giving importance to bowlers also with batsmen.

Cover Drive 
Here, the contestants are given some audio-visual questions to answer. Questions range from one to four runs (score). The contestants are questioned, without options, on either a video or an audio clip, depending on their choice. The help and challenge options are also available here.

This round is quite similar to the Power Play round; only the question pattern is different.

In season 8, people could take help in this round from the Captain's Squad.

In season 9, there is a chance to flip the question to others. If that participant is correct, he gets double marks. If he can't, he gets negative marks in single. But, other participants can't flip the questions to the same person who got the flipped question. But, the person who flipped it, must have to answer another question for the same points. As the Captain's Squad is removed in this season, no one will be able to take help.

In season 3, it was named as Chaturanga.

One contestant is eliminated.

Googly 
The Googly round is quite similar to the type of bowling in cricket it is named after. As the bowler surprises the batsman with such a delivery, the contestants are also baffled by riddles or rebus puzzles. This is perhaps the hardest round in the game, but certainly the most enjoyable.

In season 8, each contestant could choose from googly and doosra. As a doosra question was more difficult, a contestant could get 12 points for the right answer and minus 12 points for the wrong answer. Actually a doosra question was an audio-visual googly. A googly question has six points. A contestant gets six points for the right answer and minus six points for the wrong answer. Others cannot challenge the contestant (who is asked the question) in this tricky round. No help is available in this round.

One contestant is eliminated.

Googly was renamed as Googly/Doosra round in season 8.

In season 9, Doosra got removed and got renamed as Googly again.

Slog Over 
The remaining three contestants are asked 12 rapid fire questions with 2 options. Previously (before season 5) the number of questions was 18. The fastest one to press the buzzer after the question is asked gets to answer the particular question. But if the contestant presses the buzzer during 'Dada' is asking the question, then he will, however, complete the question but not give the two options to him/her. One who manages to answer consecutive three questions correctly gets a 'free hit' which means that the participant will get a special opportunity that he/she will only answer the question to boost up their scores and getting it right will bring him/her 6 points but there will be no negative marking for him in the question. Questions that all the contestants have failed to answer are asked to the Runners' Bench at random.

If any contestant fails to give the correct answers or gives wrong answers to three consecutive questions, he/she cannot attempt the next question. That means, the next question is thrown among the other two contestants.

In season 9, the chance of getting points is higher in this round, as the system is, if the question no. is 1, then he will get 1 point, if it is 2, he will get 2 points. Here the 'free hit' is the value of the number of the question after the three consecutive correct answers. For example, if the participant gives consecutive correct answers to question numbers 3, 4, 5; so the value of the 'free hit' question is 6 points.

Later on in season 9, the number of questions are reduced to 6. The scoring system is:

One contestant is eliminated.

In season 3, it was named as Quick or Quack. In the second half of season 7, this round was called Full Toss giving importance to bowlers also with batsmen.

Bapi Bari Ja 
The remaining duo is head-to-head in this final obstacle to victory. The contestants are told to choose from six subjects alternatively, from which they will be asked questions. Similar to the Bouncer round, one can challenge the other. If they decide to challenge in this round, their answers are kept unknown to each other until they have finalized them.

In season 8, participant could take help from the Captain's Squad but the challenger could not.

In season 9, participant can choose how much runs they want for the question, it must be 6, 12, 18 or 24 points. If another challenges, he will get the points if he gets the correct answer and if he can't, he will negative markings. It is the same rule for the participant and the challenger in season 9. Taking help from Captain's Squad is no more available now. However, a 'Vaseline Clue' is given to the one who has the question. At first the challenger finalizes the answer then 'Dada' gives the one a help which aids to answer the question. Now each participant gets only one help in the whole round.

Later in season 9, the number of topics is reduced to 4 from 6. In a special episode, the 4 participants having the most number of points get their own questions 1 each. But everyone irrespective of greatest or least score can challenge the question.

Again, there will be a step up chance consisting of 4 and 6 runs question if any contestant reaches to 90 to 99 runs available from season 2.

The contestant who has scored more runs wins the game.

In season 3 'Bapi Bari Ja' round was renamed as 'Check Mate' round, in season 4 it was again named as 'Bapi Bari Ja'.

Winning Districts 
 Season 1 – Kolkata
 Season 2 – North 24 Parganas
 Season 3 – Bardhaman
 Season 4 – North 24 Parganas
 Season 5 – Bardhaman
 Season 6 – East Midnapore
 Season 7 – North 24 Parganas
 Season 8 – Darjeeling
 Season 9 – Birbhum

Chief Guests in Season Finales
 Season 1 – Shah Rukh Khan
 Season 2 – Prosenjit Chatterjee, Jeet & Mithun Chakraborty
 Season 3 – Alka Yagnik & Udit Narayan
 Season 4 – Farhan Akhtar, Vidya Balan, Prosenjit Chatterjee & Rachana Banerjee
 Season 5 – Bipasha Basu, Monali Thakur & Palash Sen
 Season 6 – Ankush Hazra, Mimi Chakraborty, Nusrat Jahan & Sayantika Banerjee, Jeet
 Season 7 – Sachin Tendulkar
 Season 8 – Raghab Chattopadhyay, Manomoy Bhattacharya, Upal Sengupta, Anindya Chatterjee, Anupam Roy, Mir Afsar Ali, Rupankar Bagchi, Somlata Acharyya Chowdhury, Monami Ghosh
 Season 9 – Dona Ganguly, Prosenjit Chatterjee, Rupam Islam, Soumitrisha Kundu, Anwesha Hazra, Shweta Bhattacharya, Rubel Das, Biswanath Basu, Kanchan Mullick, Ditipriya Roy, Raghab Chattopadhyay, Somlata Acharyya Chowdhury, Iman Chakraborty, Manomoy Bhattacharya, Jojo

Adaptations

Ratings

References 

Bengali-language television programming in India
Indian reality television series
Quiz shows
Zee Bangla original programming